Aymar-DeMuth Propellers was an American manufacturer of wood laminate and composite propellers for homebuilt aircraft. The company headquarters was located in Ellicott City, Maryland.

The company discontinued operations in 2012 after the death of founder, Mike DeMuth.

See also
List of aircraft propeller manufacturers

References 

Aircraft propeller manufacturers
Aerospace companies of the United States